Matilda Alyson Faith Rosenblatt (née Sturridge) is an English actress.

Early life
One of three siblings, Tom Sturridge and Arthur, she is the  only daughter of film director Charles Sturridge and actress Phoebe Nicholls.

She attended Harrodian School in Barnes along with other actors such as Robert Pattinson and Jack Whitehall, and then received training at RADA.

Personal life
Rosenblatt had a son named Rudy with her boyfriend, Charlie, when she was twenty-one. The relationship dissolved shortly after. She married Ollie Rosenblatt in 2016 with whom she had a daughter, Scout Heather Rosenblatt.

Career
Sturridge appeared in Agatha Christie's Poirot (in the adaptation of the novel Third Girl) and in Midsomer Murders, both in 2009. Since then, she made a brief appearance in one episode in the second season of The Borgias, and had minor roles in the TV series Pramface and the movie About Time. On stage, she portrayed Daisy Buchanan in a Fringe musical production of The Great Gatsby in 2013, and starred as Wendy in the Portobello Panto's production of Peter Pan in December 2014.

Filmography

References

External links

English television actresses
English film actresses
Alumni of RADA
Living people
20th-century English actresses
21st-century English actresses
English child actresses
Year of birth missing (living people)